Carex phragmitoides is a tussock-forming perennial in the family Cyperaceae. It is native to eastern parts of Africa.

See also
 List of Carex species

References

phragmitoides
Plants described in 1925
Taxa named by Georg Kükenthal
Flora of Ethiopia
Flora of Tanzania
Flora of Kenya